Sociedad Geológica del Perú (Geological Society of Peru) is a professional association of Peruvian geologists. The association was established in 1924. The society posits its mission as: "Spreading knownledge of Earth Science, aiding scientific research while promoting cultural exchange". Sociedad Geológica del Perú has been active in cases concerning geological risk assessment, as such it denounced in 2015 the development plans for a hotel at the cliffs of the Costa Verde amid the tsunami hazard zone.

Boletín de la Sociedad Geológica del Perú

Boletín de la Sociedad Geológica del Perú is a peer-reviewed scientific journal published on an irregular basis by the Sociedad Geológica del Perú. The journal was established in 1925 and articles are published in Spanish. The editor-in-chief is José Macharé Ordoñez (Instituto Científico del Agua).

References

External links

Professional associations based in Peru
Geology of Peru
Geology societies
1924 establishments in Peru
Science and technology in Peru
Scientific organisations based in Peru
Organizations established in 1924